Ophichthus asakusae is an eel in the family Ophichthidae (worm/snake eels). It was described by David Starr Jordan and John Otterbein Snyder in 1901. It is a marine, temperate water-dwelling eel which is known from Japan, in the northwestern Pacific Ocean.

References

Taxa named by David Starr Jordan
Taxa named by John Otterbein Snyder
Fish described in 1901
asakusae